This article details the international fixtures and results of the Singapore national football team.

Fixtures and results

Prior to 1970

1970s to 1980s

1990s

2000s to 2010s

2020s

External links
 Football Association of Singapore

results
National association football team results